Ballaragh Halt (sometimes Bulgham) (Manx: Stadd Balley Ragh (Yn Volgan)) is an intermediate stopping place on the northerly section of the Manx Electric Railway on the Isle of Man

Location
It is the nearest stopping place to the line's summit.  The halt is little used today but following a large landslip that severed the line in 1967 it acted as the railway's temporary terminus.  Passengers would disembark their tramcar, walk onto the road and re-board a northerly based car to continue their journey.  The halt serves the small hamlet of the same name, and is sometimes referred to as "Bulgham Bay" in literature.

Platforms
The site of the halt is discernible from the main road that runs parallel as it features a set of steps for passengers built into the stone wall that separates the two.  During July 2009 at a point a little further north of the station, a viewing platform consisting of planking and railings was erected here to demarcate the passenger-accessible land for special tram services that operate in the area.

Dedication
Further north still is the summit of the line, at which point a plaque has been erected to the memory of Mike Goodwyn, historian and chairman of the Manx Electric Railway Society and this is visible from the passing tramcars.

Route

Also
Manx Electric Railway Stations

References

Sources
 Manx Manx Electric Railway Stopping Places (2002) Manx Electric Railway Society
 Island Island Images: Manx Electric Railway Pages (2003) Jon Wornham
 Official Tourist Department Page (2009) Isle Of Man Heritage Railways

Railway stations in the Isle of Man
Manx Electric Railway
Railway stations opened in 1899
1899 establishments in the Isle of Man